Mary C. Robichaux (born August 24, 1955) is a Democrat who represented District 48 in the Georgia House of Representatives from January 14, 2019, until January 9, 2023.

Political career 

In 2018, Robichaux ran for election to represent District 48 in the Georgia House of Representatives. She defeated Republican incumbent Betty Price with 50.3% of the vote. She ran for reelection in 2020.

As of July 2020, Robichaux was on the following committees:
 Human Relations & Aging
 Small Business Development
 Special Rules

On November 8, 2022, she lost re-election to District 48 to Scott Hilton, a Republican.

Electoral record

Personal life 

Robichaux grew up in rural Louisiana and graduated from the University of New Orleans and Louisiana State University Medical Center. Her career has included working for the American Heart Association and Johns Hopkins Hospital. She has lived in Roswell, Georgia since 1993, and she and her husband, Rory, have two children.

References 

Living people
Democratic Party members of the Georgia House of Representatives
21st-century American politicians
21st-century American women politicians
1955 births